Wilson Lloyd "Chick" Fewster (November 10, 1896 – April 16, 1945) was an American professional baseball second baseman. He played eleven seasons in Major League Baseball (MLB) between 1917 and 1927 for the New York Yankees, Boston Red Sox, Cleveland Indians, and Brooklyn Robins. In his career, Fewster hit six home runs and drove in 167 RBI. He died of coronary occlusion at age 49.

Fewster played for the Yankees in the 1921 World Series. He was the first player to bat at Yankee Stadium.

Fewster is perhaps best known for being a part of one of the most famous flubs in baseball history, the "three men on third" incident that occurred during the 1926 season. Fewster was on first and future Hall of Famer Dazzy Vance was on second when teammate Babe Herman hit a long ball and began racing around the bases. As Herman rounded second, the third base coach yelled at him to go back, since Fewster had not yet passed third. Vance, having rounded third, misunderstood and thought the instructions to reverse course were for him. Thus, Vance returned to third at the same time Fewster arrived there. Meanwhile, Herman ignored the instruction to go back and also arrived at third at the same time. The third baseman tagged out Herman and Fewster; Vance was declared safe by rule.

References

External links

1896 births
1945 deaths
Major League Baseball second basemen
New York Yankees players
Boston Red Sox players
Cleveland Indians players
Brooklyn Robins players
Baseball players from Baltimore
Richmond Climbers players
Baltimore Orioles (IL) players
Jersey City Skeeters players
Montreal Royals players